Franziska Heinz (born 21 November 1972) is a former East German and German female handball player. She was a member of the Germany women's national handball team. She was part of the  team at the 1996 Summer Olympics, playing 4 matches. On club level she played for Borussia Dortmund in Dortmund.

References

1972 births
Living people
German female handball players
Handball players at the 1996 Summer Olympics
Olympic handball players of Germany
Sportspeople from Magdeburg